No. 182 Squadron RAF was a Royal Air Force Squadron formed as a fighter-bomber unit in World War II.

History

Formation in World War II
The squadron formed on 25 August 1942 at RAF Martlesham Heath and was supplied with Hurricanes and Typhoons. It then operated the Typhoons from several locations in the United Kingdom including RAF Snailwell, RAF Lasham, RAF Odiham and RAF Hurn. It attacked  V-1 flying bomb launch sites and supported the Normandy landings in June 1944. It then relocated to France where it followed the allied advance across Europe seeking targets of opportunity. It disbanded in Lübeck, Germany on 30 September 1945.

Aircraft operated

References

External links
 Squadron history on the official RAF website

182
Military units and formations established in 1942